Sistema 700 was a personal professional microcomputer, introduced by the Brazilian computer company Prológica in 1981.

General information

Based on the Zilog Z80A 8-bit, 4MHz microprocessor, it had 64 KiB RAM configuration and two 5-1/4" floppy disk drives with capacity for up to 320 KiB of storage.

Its operating system was DOS-700, a version adapted by Prologica's software engineering department from the CP/M-80.

It achieved relative commercial success in financial, database and engineering applications. Due to the compatibility with the popular CP/M system, various applications like Fortran ANS, BASIC compiler, COBOL ANSI 74 compiler, Algol, Pascal, PL/I, MUMPS/M, RPG, Faturol C could be used. Other applications like word processors (WordStar), spreadsheets (CalcStar) and databases (DataStar and dBase II) were also compatible. Your applications could be programmed in BASIC, Cobol-80 and Fortran.

Models

Sistema 700 (1981 - vapourware)
Initial model announced in 1981, but never went into production. 

Super Sistema 700 (1981)
Final version with graphite-colored cabinet and rounded contours.

Data Storage

Data storage was done in audio cassette. Audio cables were supplied with the computer for connection with a regular tape recorder.

Accessories

P-720 Printer.

Bibliography
 Micro Computador - Curso Básico. Rio de Janeiro: Rio Gráfica, 1984, v. 1, pp. 49–50.

References 

Prológica computers 
Computer-related introductions in 1981
Goods manufactured in Brazil
Personal computers
Products introduced in 1981